There are at least 67 species of mammals known to live within Yellowstone National Park, a  protected area in the Rocky Mountains of Wyoming, Montana, and Idaho.
Species are listed by common name, scientific name, typical habitat, and relative abundance.

Canids

 
Order: Carnivora
Family: Canidae

Coyote (Canis latrans) valleys, grasslands, forests – common
Northwestern wolf (Canis lupus occidentalis) valleys, grasslands, forests – common
Wasatch mountain fox (Vulpes vulpes macroura) meadows, forests – common

Bears

Order: Carnivora
Family: Ursidae

Grizzly bear (Ursus arctos horribilis) grasslands, forests, alpine tundra – common
American black bear (Ursus americanus) forests – common

Raccoons
Order: Carnivora
Family: Procyonidae

Common raccoon (Procyon lotor) rivers, cottonwoods – rare

Felids
Order: Carnivora
Family: Felidae

Cougar (Puma concolor) forests, rock outcrops – uncommon
Canada lynx (Lynx canadensis) coniferous forests – rare
Bobcat (Lynx rufus) coniferous forests, rock outcroppings – common

Weasels

Order: Carnivora
Family: Mustelidae

Wolverine (Gulo gulo) alpine tundra, coniferous forests – rare
North American river otter (Lontra canadensis) rivers – common
Pacific marten (Martes caurina) coniferous forests – common
American ermine or short-tailed weasel (Mustela richardsonii) willows, spruce forests – common
Long-tailed weasel (Neogale frenata) forests, meadows, wetlands – common
American mink (Neogale vison) streams, rivers – uncommon
Fisher (Pekania pennanti) forests – rare
American badger (Taxidea taxus) grasslands, sagebrush – common

Skunks
Order: Carnivora
Family: Mephitidae

Striped skunk (Mephitis mephitis) riparian forests – rare

Rabbits and hares

Order: Lagomorpha
Family: Leporidae

Mountain cottontail (Sylvilagus nuttallii) shrublands – common
Desert cottontail (Sylvilagus audubonii) shrublands – common
Snowshoe hare (Lepus americanus) coniferous forests, willows – common
White-tailed jackrabbit (Lepus townsendii) sagebrush, grasslands – common

Pikas
Order: Lagomorpha
Family: Ochotonidae

American Pika (Ochotona princeps) alpine tundra, rocky areas – common

Bovids

Order: Artiodactyla
Family: Bovidae

Plains bison (Bison bison bison) grasslands, sagebrush, shrubland – abundant
Rocky Mountain bighorn sheep (Ovis canadensis canadensis) cliffs, rock outcroppings, alpine tundra – uncommon
Mountain Goat (Oreamnos americanus) cliffs, rock outcroppings, alpine tundra – uncommon (non-native)

Pronghorn

Order: Artiodactyla
Family: Antilocapridae

Pronghorn (Antilocapra americana) sagebrush, grassland – common

Elk, moose, and deer

Order: Artiodactyla
Family: Cervidae

Northwestern white-tailed deer (Odocoileus virginianus ochrourus) grasslands, forests – uncommon
Rocky Mountain mule deer (Odocoileus hemionus hemionus) grasslands, shrubland, forests – common
Rocky Mountain elk (Cervus canadensis nelsoni) grasslands, shrubland, forest, alpine tundra – abundant
Shiras moose (Alces alces shirasi) grasslands, forests, river, lakes – uncommon

Shrews
Order: Soricomorpha
Family: Soricidae

Dusky shrew (Sorex monticolus) meadows, forests – common
Masked shrew (Sorex cinereous) meadows, forests – common
American water shrew (Sorex palustris) meadows, riparian areas – common
Preble's shrew (Sorex preblei) meadows, forests – rare, if present
Dwarf shrew (Sorex nanus) meadows, forests – common.

Beavers
Order: Rodentia
Family: Castoridae

American beaver (Castor canadensis) riparian areas – fairly common, increasing

Squirrels

Order: Rodentia
Family: Sciuridae

Least chipmunk (Neotamias minimus) meadows, forests – common
Uinta chipmunk (Neotamias umbrinus) meadows, forests – common
Yellow-pine chipmunk (Neotamias amoenus) meadows, forests – common
American red squirrel (Tamiasciurus hudsonicus) coniferous forests – common
Northern flying squirrel (Glaucomys sabrinus) forests – occasional
Yellow-bellied marmot (Marmota flaventris) forests, meadows, rocky areas – common
Uinta ground squirrel (Urocitellus armatus) meadows, sagebrush – common
Golden-mantled ground squirrel (Callospermophilus lateralis) meadows, forests, rocky areas, alpine tundra – common

Voles and Woodrats

Order: Rodentia
Family: Cricetidae

Common muskrat (Ondatra zibethicus) riparian – occasional
Western heather vole (Phenacomys intermedius) sagebrush, grasslands, forest – occasional
Water vole (Microtus richardsoni) riparian – occasional
Long-tailed vole (Microtus longicaudus) meadows – common
Southern red-backed vole (Myodes gapperi) coniferous forests – common
Meadow vole (Microtus pennsylvanicus) meadows – common
Montane vole (Microtus montanus) meadows, sagebrush, riparian – common
Bushy-tailed woodrat (Neotoma cinerea) rocky areas – common

Mice

Order: Rodentia
Family: Cricetidae

Deer mouse (Peromyscus maniculatus) grasslands – common

Jumping mice
Order: Rodentia
Family: Dipodidae

Western jumping mouse (Zapus princeps) riparian – occasional

Porcupines

Order: Rodentia
Family: Erethizontidae

North American porcupine (Erethizon dorsatum) forests, sagebrush, riparian – common

Bats

Order: Chiroptera
Family: Vespertilionidae

Little brown bat (Myotis lucifugus) roosts in caves, trees, buildings – common
Big brown bat (Eptesicus fuscus) roosts in sheltered areas – common
Long-eared myotis (Myotis evotis) roosts on cliffs, buildings – uncommon
Long-legged myotis (Myotis volans) roosts in cliffs, tree cavities, buildings – common
Townsend's big-eared bat (Coryhinus townsendii) roosts in caves – uncommon
Fringe-tailed bat (Myotis thysanodes) roosts in cliffs, snags – uncommon
Hoary bat (Lasiurus cinereus) roosts in trees – uncommon
Silver-haired bat (Lasionycteris noctivagans) roosts in trees, snags – common
Spotted bat (Euderma maculatum) roosts on cliffs, trees – uncommon
Pallid bat (Antrozous pallidus) roosts on cliffs, caves, buildings – uncommon
California myotis (Myotis californicus) roosts in trees, rock crevices, and buildings
Western small-footed myotis (Myotis ciliolabrum) roosts in caves, rocky areas – rare
Yuma myotis (Myotis yumanensis) roosts in caves, buildings, trees – rare

See also

 Small mammals of Yellowstone National Park
 Animals of Yellowstone

Further reading

References

mammals
Mammals
mammals
Yellowstone